Hugo Brehme, (3 December 1882, Eisenach, Germany; 13 June 1954, Mexico City) was a German-born photographer of Mexico. Working almost exclusively in black and white, he established a photographic studio in Mexico City “Fotografía Artística Hugo Brehme“ as early as 1912. It was a successful business for forty years.  His subject matter photos of traditional rural Mexico, scenic landscapes, railways, modern monuments and archeological sites.  His picturesque photos were placed in tourist guides and magazines and he produced a large number of photos for postcards. He was an early mentor of noted Mexican photographer Manuel Alvarez Bravo.

Collections of his photos are found at Texas State University, San Marcos and Southern Methodist University, as well as the Fototeca Nacional, the Mexican government repository for photographs. At the Fototeca, the Hugo Brehme Collection was begun with a donation by Juan Manuel Casasola Tezcucano, of the Casasola family of photographers. Added to the Fototeca were other Brehme photos, totaling 1,846 negatives and 278 positives. "There are images presumed to be by this photographer in other collections" [of the Fototeca]. Brehme photographs documenting two episodes of the Mexican Revolution in 1913 and 1914 are found at the Getty Research Institute.

Gallery

References

Further reading
Casanova, Rosa and Adriana Konzevik. Mexico: A Photographic History: A Selective Catalogue of the Fototeca Nacional of the INAH. Mexico City: INAH/RM 2007. 
Debroise, Olivier.  Mexican Suite: A History of Photography in Mexico. Trans. Stella de Sá Rego. Austin: University of Texas Press 2001.
Frost, Susan Toomey. Timeless Mexico: The Photographs of Hugo Brehme. Austin: University of Texas Press 2011. 

1882 births
1954 deaths
Mexican photographers
Photographers from Thuringia
People from Eisenach
German emigrants to Mexico